Tuktuq is a Canadian docufiction film from Quebec, directed by Robin Aubert and released in 2016. The film stars Aubert as Martin Brodeur, a cameraman who is sent to a small Inuit village in the Nunavik region of Quebec as part of a government project to film the community, but soon learns that the reason behind the project is that the residents are about to be forcibly displaced as part of a major new hydroelectricity development.

The film's cast also includes Robert Morin in a voice role as the government minister, and Brigitte Poupart as his ex-girlfriend. It was made while Aubert was on a cultural exchange residency in Kangiqsujuaq in 2012.

The film received three Prix Iris nominations at the 20th Quebec Cinema Awards in 2018: Best Picture, Best Supporting Actor (Morin) and Best Editing (Aubert).

References

External links

2016 films
Canadian docufiction films
Films set in Quebec
Films directed by Robin Aubert
2016 drama films
Films about Inuit in Canada
French-language Canadian films
2010s Canadian films